Patricia "Trish" Tilby is a fictional character appearing in American comic books published by Marvel Comics. The character first appeared in X-Factor vol. 1 #7

Fictional character biography
Trish Tilby is a television news reporter, and predominantly seen working for CBNC (an obvious allusion to CNBC News Network, due to the logo, as well as accidentally being called CNBC in an issue of X-Men vol. 2). She is the on-again/off-again ally of the X-Men.

She originally appears investigating X-Factor when the team were pretending to be mutant-hunters as a way of gathering persecuted mutants into the fold. With aide from Mystique, she reveals that Warren Worthington, secretly the hero known as Angel, was backing the team.

She is one of the many humans wounded when the anti-mutant group "The Right" open fire on innocents as a distraction during a battle.

Trish also reports on the team's battle with the villain Apocalypse. Around then she meets Hank McCoy, the Beast. They soon begin what would be a very rocky relationship. They share their first kiss after his re-transformation into his blue-furred form.

During part of the time Hank was part of X-Factor, Trish Tilby works for W-ARC TV, alongside her older ex-husband Paul Burton. This, of course, causes tension in the relationship. Beast becomes depressed after he misinterprets a friendly peck on the cheek shared between Trish and Paul.

Beast has actually returned to the human-like form he had when he first joined the X-Men. This has also affected his intelligence-level, making it rather low, but eventually he reverts to his blue-furred appearance and his high-intellect. He also readopts his wisecracking sense of humour. Trish becomes a little distant from him at this stage claiming that, although she "could get used to the fur", she finds his attitude of literally laughing in the face of danger disconcerting.

Trish and Beast's relationship becomes further strained when she tells the world of the Legacy Virus, especially how the long-term ally of the X-Men, Moira MacTaggert, a human, has become infected. They have an intense argument in Trish's workplace, in which she blames Hank for not curing the virus fast enough.

X-Men Adventures

Hank dumps her over this situation. They end up getting back together after they are both kidnapped by the murderous alternate-universe double of Hank called the Dark Beast. Trish redeems herself soon after.

Trish is featured in the back-up story for the second 'X-Men' annual. Her interviewee, a doctor, is attacked by a delusional mutant. She is slightly injured as well. Beast, working with on-site security, saves them both.

Trish joins Hank, Gambit, Bishop, Joseph and Rogue on a Christmas trip to the city. Trish is taken away also Shi'ar alien Gladiator teleports away the entire team. She works with the X-Men to fight the threat of the Phalanx, who are devastating the Shi'ar empire. Bishop becomes separated from the group.

When the team returns to Earth they become lost in Antarctica. The group become captives of the robotic entity called Nanny, a creation of Magneto obsessed with protecting mutants from the outside world. Her human status allowed Trish to get in a quick smash with a weapon, disabling 'Nanny'. Unfortunately the group is soon waylaid by Magneto himself, under the guise of Erik The Red. Trish is forced to be part of the jury in the trial of Gambit, who had led a charge that resulted in innocent deaths years back. Trish returns with other X-Men, (apart from Gambit) to New York by way of Psylocke's mystical powers.

The entire adventure earns her honorary X-Men status. Yet returning to the X-Mansion doesn't end the dangers. Her 'team' is now in danger from a nanotech bomb implanted inside Cyclops, threatening to obliterate everything in three square miles. Doctor Cecilia Reyes, herself a mutant, saves everyone.

Tilby makes a brief cameo in Venom Carnage Unleashed #3, reporting on the mysterious death of a computer expert and the escape of Carnage from the Ravencroft facility. Events of this series spill over into Venom: Sinner Take All #1, where Trish is an on-scene witness to the shotgun murder of a video game CEO and his cowardly lawyer. The murders are committed by a vigilante calling himself the Sin-Eater. Trish also witnesses the shooting of Ann Weying, the wife of Eddie Brock. Ann survives her wounds.

Tilby is on the job as Magneto's electromagnetic shock wave causes worldwide damage.

Magneto, in control of Genosha, sees his sick and dying mutants cured by the eradication of the Legacy Virus. He reveals his plans for a new army in an exclusive interview with Trish.

Feline problems

A beating by Vargas and a power-adjustment by Sage leads to Beast looking much more feline, just in time for the villain Cassandra Nova. Impersonating Professor X, she exposes the X-Men to the world and Trish's relationship with Hank comes to light. A news article uses the word 'bestiality' three times in referring to their relationship. This causes Trish to break up with Hank via an answering machine, right before a big date.

Later, Trish is invited with dozens of other media representatives after the mansion is officially outed as a haven for mutants. This otherwise peaceful encounter is marred by an attack by Cassandra Nova. The reporters hide in the Danger Room; Trish apologizes for treating Hank harshly. They seemingly part as friends, with Hank jokingly confessing to being gay.

After the Scarlet Witch's reality warp wiped out most mutant's powers, Trish is seen reporting on the status of the residents of Mutant Town, New York.  She sees Bishop and worried, asks him of Beast and to tell Hank she was asking.

Tilby is seen reporting on the various disasters befalling the Earth in a magically-created incident.

Other versions

House of M
Trish appears in the House of M, still a reporter and reports the tension between humans and mutants

Ultimate
In the 'Ultimate' universe, Trish is also a television reporter; she is seen reporting on the release of Hank Pym to Tony Stark.

References

Marvel Comics characters
Fictional reporters